Elections to Liverpool City Council were held on 1 November 1929. After the election, the composition of the council was:

Election result

Ward results

* - Councillor seeking re-election

Comparisons are made with the 1926 election results.

Abercromby

Aigburth

Allerton

Anfield

Breckfield

Brunswick

Castle Street

Childwall

Croxteth

Dingle

Edge Hill

Everton

Exchange

Fairfield

Fazakerley

Garston

Granby

Great George

Kensington

Kirkdale

Low Hill

Much Woolton

Netherfield

North Scotland

Old Swan

Prince's Park

Sandhills

St. Anne's

St. Domingo

St. Peter's

Sefton Park East

Sefton Park West

South Scotland

Vauxhall

Walton

Warbreck

Wavertree

Wavertree West

West Derby

Aldermanic Elections

Aldermanic Election 9 November 1929

The terms of office of sixteen aldermen expired on 9 November 1929, and two additional vacancies were caused by the elections of Herbert John Davis and Frank Campbell Wilson as Councillors.

18 Aldermen were elected under the provisions of the Municipal Corporations Act, 1882, by the councillors on 9 November 1929 for a term of six years.
Each Alderman acted as the returning officer to the ward to which they were allocated.

 - re-elected aldermen.

Councillor David Gilbert Logan JP (Labour, North Scotland, elected 1 November 1927) of 362a Scotland Road, Liverpool was elected by the councillors as an alderman for the Croxteth ward on 9 November 1929 pursuant to the Order of His Majesty in Council dated 5 July 1929.

Aldermanic Election 2 April 1930

Following the death on 17 February 1930 of Alderman Charles Henry Rutherford JP (Conservative, last elected as an alderman on 9 November 1929), Councillor Mabel Fletcher JP (Conservative, Sefton Park West, elected 1 November 1927) was elected as an alderman by the councillors on 2 April 1930.

Aldermanic Election 1 October 1930

Following the death on 8 May 1930 of Alderman Herbert Reynolds Rathbone (Liberal, last elected as an alderman on 9 November 1926), Councillor Burton William Eills JP (Liberal, St. Peter's, elected 1 November 1927) was elected as an alderman by the councillors on 1 October 1930.

By-elections

No. 20 Low Hill, 7 November 1929

Caused by the resignation of Councillor Edward Gerard Deery (Labour, Low Hill, elected on 1 November 1927), which was reported to the Council on 23 October 1929.

The term of office to expire on 1 November 1930.

No.12 Dingle, 20 November 1929

Caused by the election of Councillor William Wallace Kelly (Conservative, elected as an alderman on 23 October 1929)

No. 18 Edge Hill, 27 November 1929

Caused by the election of Councillor Charles Wilson (Labour, Edge Hill, elected 1 November 1928) as an alderman by the councillors on 9 November 1929.

No. 6 St. Anne's, 28 November 1929

Caused by the election of Councillor James Sexton C.B.E. MP (Labour, St. Anne's, elected 1 November 1927) as an alderman by the councillors on 9 November 1929.

No. 1 Sandhills, 3 December 1929

Caused by the election of Councillor Thomas Wafer Byrne (Labour, Sandhills, elected 1 November 1928) as an alderman by the councillors on 9 November 1929.

No. 2 North Scotland, 3 December 1929

Caused by the election of Councillors William Albert Robinson (Labour, North Scotland, elected 1 November 1929) and David Gilbert Logan (Labour, North Scotland, elected 1 November 1927) as aldermen by the councillors on 9 November 1929.

No. 21 Everton, 3 December 1929

Caused by the election of Councillors Frederick Thomas Richardson (Labour, Everton, elected 1 November 1929) and Henry Walker (Labour, Everton, elected 1 November 1928) as aldermen by the councillors on 9 November 1929.

No. 7 Castle Street, 17 December 1929

Caused by the resignation of Councillor Sir John Sandeman Allen MP (Conservative, Castle Street, elected unopposed 1 November 1928) which was reported to the Council on 4 December 1929

No. 15 Sefton Park East, 11 March 1930

Caused by the death of Councillor Sir Arnold Rushton JP (Conservative, Sefton Park East, elected 1 November 1928) on 5 February 1930
.

No. 16 Sefton Park West, 

Caused by the election as an alderman on 2 April 1930 of Councillor Mabel Fletcher JP (Conservative, Sefton Park West, elected 1 November 1926), following the death of Alderman Charles Henry Rutherford JP (Conservative, last elected as an alderman on 9 November 1928) on 17 February 1930.

No. 8 St. Peter's, 

Following the death on 8 May 1930 of Alderman Herbert Reynolds Rathbone (Liberal, last elected as an alderman on 9 November 1926), Councillor Burton William Eills JP (Liberal, St. Peter's, elected 1 November 1927) was elected as an alderman by the councillors on 1 October 1930 causing a vacancy in the St. Peter's ward

No. 27 Fazakerley, 3 June 1930

Caused by the resignation of Councillor George Herbert Charters (Conservative, Fazakerley, elected 1 November 1927) was reported to the Council on 22 May 1930.

No. 18 Edge Hill, 3 August 1930

Caused by the resignation of Councillor Robert Tissyman  (Labour, Edge Hill, elected 1 November 1927), which was reported to the Council on 30 July 1930.

See also

 Liverpool City Council
 Liverpool Town Council elections 1835 - 1879
 Liverpool City Council elections 1880–present
 Mayors and Lord Mayors of Liverpool 1207 to present
 History of local government in England

References

1929
1929 English local elections
November 1929 events
1920s in Liverpool